LaVergne Glacier is a tributary glacier about  long, flowing east along the southern slopes of the Seabee Heights of Antarctica to enter Liv Glacier close southwest of McKinley Nunatak. It was named by the Advisory Committee on Antarctic Names for Lieutenant Commander Cornelius B. de LaVergne, Deputy Commander of Antarctic Support Activity at McMurdo Station during U.S. Navy Operation Deep Freeze, 1961.

References

Glaciers of Dufek Coast